Arante Mulla Kochu Mulla is a Malayalam family film, directed by Balachandra Menon, starring Balachandra Menon, Shankar, Srividya, and Laksmi. The film is noted for the performances of the late Srividya and Laksmi, who portray sisters-in-law.

Plot
Sisters-by-marriage Maheswariyamma (Lakshmi) and Thankamani Kunjamma (Srividya), though feigning mutual affection, are in fact bitter rivals: when the rich, handsome bank manager Omanakuttan (Shankar) arrives in town, they both plot alliances between him and their respective daughters, Kavitha and Bindu. The arrival of another stranger, Prabhakaran (Balachandra Menon), transforms the story.

Cast

Balachandra Menon as Prabhakaran/Anaadhan
Shankar Panikkar as Bank Manager Omanakkuttan
Rohini as Rohini
Sabitha Anand as Kavitha (Thankamani Kunjamma's daughter)
Lakshmi as Maheswariyamma
Srividya as Thankamani Kunjamma
Venu Nagavalli as Accountant Joy
Lissy as Bindu (Maheswariyamma's daughter)
M. G. Soman as Panchayath President
Thilakan as Member Bhargavan Pillai
Maniyan Pillai Raju as Rajappan
Sankaradi as Former Bank Manager
P. K. Abraham as Priest
T. P. Madhavan
Sukumari

Soundtrack
The music was composed by Alleppey Ranganath and the lyrics were written by Madhu Alappuzha.

References

External links
 
https://web.archive.org/web/20120323054015/http://popcorn.oneindia.in/title/6600/arante-mulla-kochu-mulla.html

view the film
 arante mulla kochumulla

1984 films
1980s Malayalam-language films
Films directed by Balachandra Menon